The Royal Philharmonic Orchestra, founded in London in 1946, has made a large number of recordings.

References

Orchestra discographies